Jovica Kolb (born 24 November 1963) is a Serbian former football player.

Biography
Kolb played mostly as defending midfielder in the Yugoslav First League for FK Zemun, FK Partizan and FK Sutjeska Nikšić, before moving to Belgium, in 1990, where he played with K.F.C. Verbroedering Geel until 1998.

With Partizan, he was the national champion, winning the 1985–86 Yugoslav First League and 1986–87 Yugoslav First League. Kolb also won a Yugoslav Cup and Yugoslav Super Cup in 1989.

External links
 

Living people
1963 births
Serbian footballers
Yugoslav footballers
Yugoslav First League players
FK Zemun players
FK Partizan players
FK Sutjeska Nikšić players
Serbian expatriate footballers
Expatriate footballers in Belgium
Association football midfielders